I is the debut studio album by German DJ and record producer Felix Jaehn. It was released on 16 February 2018 by L'Agentur and Virgin Records. The album features guest vocals by Marc E. Bassy, Gucci Mane, Jasmine Thompson, Polina, Alma, and Herbert Grönemeyer.

Track listing
Note: Tracklist adapted from iTunes.

Notes
  signifies a co-producer
  signifies an additional producer
  signifies a vocal producer
  signifies an original producer

Charts

Certifications

References

External links
 Felix-Jaehn.com — official site

2018 debut albums